Alexander Lundin (born 25 October 1992) is a Swedish footballer who plays for Akropolis IF as a goalkeeper.

Club career
In February 2015, Lundin joined Falkenbergs FF.

On 5 March 2020, Lundin signed with Brommapojkarna.

References

External links

1992 births
Living people
Mjällby AIF players
Husqvarna FF players
Akropolis IF players
Västerås SK Fotboll players
IF Brommapojkarna players
Swedish footballers
Allsvenskan players
Superettan players
Ettan Fotboll players
Association football goalkeepers